The Spain women's national Under-20 and under-21  is the national basketball team of Spain and is governed by the Spanish Basketball Federation. It represents Spain in international under-21 and Under-20 (under age 21 and under age 20) women's basketball competitions.

FIBA Under-21 World Championship for Women

FIBA Europe Under-20 Championship for Women

See also
 Spain women's national basketball team
 Spain women's national under-19 basketball team
 Spain women's national under-17 basketball team
 Spain men's national under-20 basketball team

References

Women's national under-20 basketball teams
Basketball